The chemical compound isopropyl nitrite (or 2-propyl nitrite) is an alkyl nitrite made from isopropanol. It is a clear pale yellow oil that is insoluble in water.

Applications 
Isopropyl nitrite is one of the compounds used as poppers, an inhalant drug that induces a brief euphoria.
Isopropyl nitrite has largely replaced isobutyl nitrite in poppers.

Safety 
For more information, see poppers.

Isopropyl nitrite has been associated with eye maculopathy, visual impairment with central scotomata, bilateral foveal yellow spots, and inner segment/outer segment (IS/OS) junction disruption, which may be reversible.

References 

Antianginals
Antidotes
Alkyl nitrites
Isopropyl esters